Stepan is a surname. Notable people with the surname include:

 Alfred Stepan (1936–2017), American comparative political scientist and professor
 Ann Stepan (1943–2015), American politician
 Derek Stepan (born 1990), American hockey player
 Marilee Stepan (born 1935), American swimmer